"Somebody" is the debut single by American record collective Internet Money featuring American rappers Lil Tecca and A Boogie wit da Hoodie. It was released on October 10, 2019 as the lead single from Internet Money's debut studio album B4 the Storm (2020).

Charts

Certifications

References

2019 singles
2019 songs
A Boogie wit da Hoodie songs
Internet Money songs
Lil Tecca songs
Song recordings produced by Taz Taylor (record producer)
Songs written by A Boogie wit da Hoodie
Songs written by Nick Mira
Songs written by Taz Taylor (record producer)